MHK Kežmarok is a professional Slovak ice hockey team playing in the Slovak Slovak 2. Liga. They play their games at Kežmarok Ice Stadium in the Slovak town of Kežmarok. The club was founded in 1931.

History
The club was founded in 1931. In the 2006–07 season Kežmarok won the title in Slovak 1. Liga. They played in Slovak Extraliga in two seasons 2007–08 season when they finished on 9th place and didn't qualify for the playoffs. In 2008–09 season they finished on 12th place and won't play in Slovak Extraliga next season.

Honours

Domestic

Slovak 1. Liga
  Winners (1): 2006–07

Notable players

 Ľuboš Bartečko
 Daniel Brejčák
 Radoslav Suchý
 Patrik Svitana
 Dávid Buc
 Adam Lapšanský
 Ján Brejčák
 Richard Jenčík

References

External links
Official website 

Kezmarok
Kezmarok
Ice hockey clubs established in 1931
1931 establishments in Czechoslovakia
Sport in Prešov Region